Dynorphin B, also known as rimorphin, is a form of dynorphin and an endogenous opioid peptide with the amino acid sequence Tyr-Gly-Gly-Phe-Leu-Arg-Arg-Gln-Phe-Lys-Val-Val-Thr. Dynorphin B is generated as a proteolytic cleavage product of leumorphin, which in turn is a cleavage product of preproenkephalin B (prodynorphin).

Dynorphin B has an identical N-terminal sequence, but different C-terminal sequence to Dynorphin A. In an alanine scan of the non-glycine residues of dynorphin B, it was discovered that Tyr1 and Phe4 residues are critical for both opioid receptor affinity and κ-opioid receptor agonist potency, Arg6 and Arg7 promote κ-opioid affinity and Lys10 contributes to the opioid receptor affinity.

Inducers of Dynorphin B 
Cannabinoid CP55,940 and △9-tetrahydrocannabinol (△9-THC) can induce the release of dynorphin B, which in return acts as an agonist of κ-opioid receptors, resulting in the production of antinociception. Similarly, Tyr-D-Arg-Phe-Sar (TAPS) is capable of promoting a release of dynorphin B through the simulation of μ1-opioid receptors, causing a production of antinociception. The antinociceptive effect produced by dynorphin B allows for spinal analgesia.

See also 
 Dynorphin

References 

Neuropeptides
Kappa-opioid receptor agonists
Opioid peptides